Luka Gračnar (born October 31, 1993) is a Slovenian professional ice hockey goaltender. He is currently playing for Eispiraten Crimmitschau of the DEL2.

Gračnar played as a member of Team Slovenia at the 2013 IIHF World Championship.

References

External links

 

1993 births
Living people
HK Acroni Jesenice players
EC Red Bull Salzburg players
EHC Black Wings Linz players
ETC Crimmitschau players
HK Poprad players
Sportspeople from Jesenice, Jesenice
Slovenian ice hockey goaltenders
Storhamar Dragons players
HC TWK Innsbruck players
Olympic ice hockey players of Slovenia
Ice hockey players at the 2014 Winter Olympics
Ice hockey players at the 2018 Winter Olympics
Slovenian expatriate sportspeople in Slovakia
Slovenian expatriate sportspeople in Germany
Slovenian expatriate sportspeople in Austria
Slovenian expatriate sportspeople in Norway
Slovenian expatriate ice hockey people
Expatriate ice hockey players in Norway
Expatriate ice hockey players in Austria
Expatriate ice hockey players in Slovakia
Expatriate ice hockey players in Germany